due to a naming rights deal with gas heater construction company Paloma, is a rugby stadium in Nagoya, Japan. It is currently used mostly for rugby union matches. The stadium holds 15,000 people and was built in 1941.

Overview
It was formerly known as Nagoya Mizuho Rugby Stadium (名古屋市瑞穂公園ラグビー場). Since April 2015 it has been called Paloma Mizuho Rugby Stadium for the naming rights.

It's also used by Toyota Verblitz, a rugby union team in the League One.

References

External links

Rugby union stadiums in Japan
Football venues in Japan
Sports venues in Nagoya
Sports venues completed in 1941
1941 establishments in Japan